A general election was held in the U.S. state of Indiana on November 6, 2018. Three of Indiana's executive offices were up for election, as well as a United States Senate seat and all of Indiana's nine seats in the United States House of Representatives.

United States Senate

United States House of Representatives

Secretary of State
 

Incumbent Republican Secretary of State Connie Lawson, who was appointed to the office in 2012, ran for re-election to a second full term in office.

Jim Harper, an attorney and 2016 Democratic nominee for the state senate in the 5th District, sought the Democratic nomination. Potential Democratic candidates include Monroe County Councilwoman Shelli Yoder.

The Indiana Green Party nominated George Wolfe, a Professor Emeritus at Ball State University and former Director of the Ball State University Center for Peace and Conflict Studies. The party has to collect 30,000 signatures to get George Wolfe on the ballot in November. The Libertarian Party nominee was Mark Rutherford, chairman of the Indiana Public Defender Commission and former vice chairman of the Libertarian National Committee.

Predictions

Polling

Results

Treasurer
 

Incumbent Republican State Treasurer Kelly Mitchell ran for re-election to a second term in office.

Auditor
 

Incumbent Republican State Auditor Tera Klutz was appointed to the office on January 9, 2017 to replace Republican Suzanne Crouch, who was elected lieutenant governor.  Klutz ran for election to a first full term.

References

External links
Candidates at Vote Smart 
Candidates at Ballotpedia
Campaign finance at OpenSecrets

Official Secretary of State campaign websites
Jim Harper (D) for Secretary of State
Connie Lawson (R) for Secretary of State 
Mark Rutherford (L) for Secretary of State 

Official State Treasurer campaign websites
John Aguilera (D) for Treasurer
Kelly Mitchell (R) for Treasurer

Official State Auditor campaign websites
Tera Klutz (R) for Auditor
Joselyn Whitticker (D) for Auditor

 
Indiana